Omoglymmius lewisi is a species of beetle in the subfamily Rhysodidae. It was described by Nakane in 1978.

References

lewisi
Beetles described in 1978